Babuyan Island (sometimes called Babuyan Claro or Curuga Mabuyan, the clear-sighted) is the highest and northernmost island in the Babuyan Islands in Luzon Strait north of Luzon Island in the Philippines and also directly south of Taiwan via Bashi Channel to Luzon Strait. The whole island makes up the barangay of Babuyan Claro, that constitute the municipality of Calayan in Cagayan province. The volcanic island has a population of 1,910 as of the 2020 census, up from 1,423 in 2010.

History
The language of Babuyan Island is sometimes classified as a dialect of Ivatan. Babuyan was depopulated by the Spanish and only repopulated at the end of the 19th century with families from Batan Island, most of them speakers of one of the Ivatan dialects.

Geography

The island seems to be steep all around. A reef projects from its western point. The south point is steep and rocky with a black, rocky, sugarloaf islet, called Pan de Azucar, close inshore.

Volcanoes
There are three other volcanic cones with no historic eruptions on the island: Cayonan, Dionisio and Naydi.

See also
List of islands of the Philippines

References

Babuyan Islands